Therioaphis trifolii, the yellow clover aphid, is a species of aphid in the family Aphididae. It is found in Europe.

Subspecies
These three subspecies belong to the species Therioaphis trifolii:
 Therioaphis trifolii albae Bozhko, 1959
 Therioaphis trifolii trifolii (Monell, 1882)
 Therioaphis trifolii ventromaculata Müller, 1968

References

Articles created by Qbugbot
Insects described in 1882
Panaphidini
Hemiptera of Europe